Dağyolu can refer to:

 Dağyolu, Beşiri
 Dağyolu, Mudurnu
 Dağyolu, Narman
 the Turkish name for Fotta